The Northern Scot is a newspaper published in Moray, Scotland.

External links
Northern Scot Website

Newspapers published in Scotland
Moray